The Brass Monkey Motorcycle Rally is an annual motorcycle rally held in Australia by the Bikers Australia club since 1985.

See also
Brass monkey (colloquialism)

References

External links

Festivals in Australia
Motorcycle rallies in Australia